The PEN/Laura Pels International Foundation for Theater Award, commonly referred to as the PEN/Laura Pels Theater Award, is awarded by the PEN America (formerly PEN American Center). It annually recognizes two American playwrights. A medal is given to a designated "grand master" American dramatist, in recognition of their work, and a stipend of $7,500 (in 2005) is presented to a "new voice", an American playwright whose literary and artistic merit is evident in their plays.

"Two playwrights are selected for the following honors: a specially commissioned art object will be presented to a master American dramatist, in recognition of his or her body of work; and a cash prize of $7,500 will be awarded to an American playwright in mid-career, whose literary achievements are vividly apparent in the rich and striking language of his or her work. In both cases, PEN/Laura Pels International Foundation for Theater honorees are writers working indisputably at the highest level of achievement. The awards were developed to reflect Laura Pels’s dedication to supporting excellence in American theatre as well as PEN’s commitment to recognizing and rewarding the playwright's literary accomplishment."

The Master American Dramatist Award is not open to nominations but is chosen by the judges panel. The Mid-Career Award is open to peer nominations (i.e., not by the playwrights themselves), but the playwrights must meet certain criteria: they must be American and write in English; they can be from regional theaters as long as they have had two full-length productions mounted under either open- or limited-run contracts and in theaters with at least 299 seats. Specifically excluded are playwrights who write one-acts, musical-books, or translations.

The award is one of many PEN awards sponsored by International PEN affiliates in over 145 PEN centers around the world. The PEN American Center awards have been characterized as being among the "major" American literary prizes.

Award winners

References

External links
PEN America
Laura Pels International Foundation for Theater Award

PEN America awards
Awards established in 1998
1998 establishments in the United States
American theater awards
Dramatist and playwright awards